Xavier 'Xavi' Companys Aguado (born 5 June 1968) is a Spanish former professional footballer who played as a central defender.

He spent 13 years with Real Zaragoza – 12 in La Liga – appearing in nearly 500 official matches and winning three major titles.

Club career
Born in Badalona, Barcelona, Catalonia, Aguado began playing as a senior with local club CF Badalona following a short spell in basketball. After two seasons at neighbours CE Sabadell FC in the Segunda División, he joined Real Zaragoza of La Liga for the 1990–91 campaign, quickly establishing as first choice whilst displaying aerial ability and leadership alike; he would be named captain early on.

Aguado was part of the Zaragoza team that beat Arsenal in the final of the 1994–95 UEFA Cup Winners' Cup. He was also on the winning side in the 2001 Copa del Rey Final, equalising an eventual 3–1 win over RC Celta de Vigo in Seville.

From 1997 to 1999, Aguado scored a total of nine league goals, including a brace in a 2–2 home draw against SD Compostela on 28 September 1997. However, during his 13-year career at the Aragonese, he also had a poor disciplinary record, collecting in the league alone 109 yellow cards and being sent off 18 times, the latter being an all-time worst in the competition until both he and Pablo Alfaro were surpassed by Sergio Ramos in 2017.

After Zaragoza's top-flight relegation in 2001–02, Aguado retired from professional football (he was still with the squad the following season, but made no appearances whatsoever) after 473 competitive games with the same club.

Honours
Zaragoza
Copa del Rey: 1993–94, 2000–01
UEFA Cup Winners' Cup: 1994–95

References

External links

1968 births
Living people
People from Badalona
Sportspeople from the Province of Barcelona
Spanish footballers
Footballers from Catalonia
Association football defenders
La Liga players
Segunda División players
Tercera División players
CF Badalona players
CE Sabadell FC footballers
Real Zaragoza players
Catalonia international footballers